The 1997 WNBA draft was the inaugural draft held by the WNBA through which teams could select new players from a talent pool of college and professional women's basketball players. Unlike later drafts, this draft was unique because there were three different stages in which teams built their rosters. First on January 22, 1997, the Initial Player Allocation draft took place in which 16 players were assigned to each team in no particular order. The elite draft portion comprised professional women's basketball players who had competed in other leagues, usually international leagues. On February 27, 1997, an elite draft added two more players to each team. On April 28, 1997, the four rounds of the regular WNBA draft took place. Draftees Cynthia Cooper, Sheryl Swoopes, and Tina Thompson would become the core pieces of the Houston Comets dynasty.

Key

Initial player allocation

Note: 16 players assigned in no particular order.

Elite draft

The elite draft portion was composed of professional women's basketball players who had competed in other leagues, usually international leagues.  It was the first time where the teams could draft the players out of a talent pool.

Round 1

Round 2

College draft

Round 1

Round 2

Round 3

Round 4

Notable undrafted players
These players were not selected in the 1997 WNBA draft but played at least one game for the WNBA.

References

Women's National Basketball Association Draft
Draft